The Farquhar Group belong to the Outer Islands of the Seychelles, lying in the southwest of the island nation, more than  southwest of the capital, Victoria, on Mahé Island.

Area

The group consists of two atolls and one separate island. In addition, there are a couple of submerged reefs in the area:
Farquhar Atoll (with two larger and about eight smaller islets)
Providence Atoll (with 2 islets, Providence Island and Cerf Island)
St. Pierre Island
Wizard Reef
Umzinto Bank (submerged)
Bulldog Bank (submerged)
McLeod Bank (submerged)

Population
There is one settlement, located on Île du Nord (North Island) of Farquhar Atoll. There is an abandoned village on Providence Island of Providence Atoll.
There are records of Maldivian mariner presence in the group from the 20th century, when a trading vessel from southern Maldives lost its course and reached Providence Atoll.

Biology
The oonopid monotypic spider species Farqua quadrimaculata is the only known spider that is endemic to the Farquhar Islands.

References 

  (2001). Dwarf hunting spiders or Oonopidae (Arachnida, Araneae) of the Seychelles. Insect Syst. Evol. 32: 307–358.

Outer Islands (Seychelles)
Archipelagoes of Seychelles